Argyra elongata is a species of fly in the family Dolichopodidae. It is found in the  Palearctic.

References

Diaphorinae
Insects described in 1843
Diptera of Europe
Taxa named by Johan Wilhelm Zetterstedt